Fakir Alamgir (21 February 1950 – 23 July 2021) was a Bangladeshi folk and pop singer.

Life
After the Bangladesh Liberation War in 1971, he emerged as a Gono Sangeet (inspiration songs for the masses) singer. Some of his notable songs are "O Sokhina", "Shantahar", "Nelson Mandela", "Naam Tar Chhilo John Henry" and "Banglar Comrade Bondhu". He was awarded Ekushey Padak in 1999 by the Government of Bangladesh.

Career
Alamgir started his music career in 1966. He played his role as a singer in 1969 uprising in East Pakistan.

Alamgir worked with Swadhin Bangla Betar Kendra during the Liberation War.

Alamgir is the founder of the cultural organization "Wrishiz Shilpi Gosthi" in 1976. He served as the president of Gono Sangeet Shamanya Parishad (GSSP) .

Alamgir was also a writer. He published his first book Chena China in 1984. His next two publications were Muktijuddher Smriti Bijoyer Gaan and Gono Sangeeter Otit O Bortoman. In 2013 he published three books - Amar Kotha, Jara Achhen Hridoy Potey and Smriti Alaponey Muktijuddho. He authored nine books.

Death
On 14 July 2021, Alamgir was admitted to United Hospital in Dhaka with COVID-19-related complications. He suffered a heart attack on 23 July while in ventilation at the COVID-19 unit. He died later on the same day.

Works
Desh Deshantor
Shadhinota Sangram Laal Shobujer Potakay
Shongskritite Amader Muktijuddho
Mayer Mukh

Awards
 Ekushey Padak
 Bhashani Padak
 Sequence Award of Honour

References

External links
 

1950 births
2021 deaths
20th-century Bangladeshi male singers
20th-century Bangladeshi singers
Bangladeshi pop singers
Bangladeshi folk singers
Recipients of the Ekushey Padak
Honorary Fellows of Bangla Academy
Deaths from the COVID-19 pandemic in Bangladesh